Crash Bandicoot 4: It's About Time is a 2020 platform game developed by Toys for Bob and published by Activision. It was originally released for the PlayStation 4 and Xbox One, with releases for the Nintendo Switch, PlayStation 5, Xbox Series X/S and Windows following in 2021. The game is the eighth main installment in the Crash Bandicoot series and a retcon of the games that originally followed Crash Bandicoot: Warped. The game's story follows Crash Bandicoot and his sister Coco as they recover the all-powerful Quantum Masks in a bid to prevent Doctor Neo Cortex and Doctor Nefarious Tropy from taking over the multiverse. They are indirectly aided by their former enemy Dingodile and an adventuring alternate-dimension counterpart of Crash's old girlfriend Tawna.

The game retains the series' core platforming gameplay, and adds new elements through the use of the Quantum Masks, who can alter levels and provide means to traverse or overcome obstacles. It also includes additional game modes for replaying levels, and the ability to control five characters, three of whom – Cortex, Dingodile, and Tawna – have their own unique gameplay and levels. The development team intended for the game to be a direct continuation from the original trilogy in both narrative and gameplay, and created the Quantum Masks and additional playable characters after studying the series' mechanics and determining fresh elements to add to the gameplay.

The game was met with a positive critical reception, with praise going to the preservation and refinement of the series' classic formula as well as the implementation of the new gameplay mechanics. The controls, amount of content and replay value, visuals, music, voice-acting, and story were also commended. The physics, level design, and difficulty drew mixed reactions, and the rail-grinding sections were criticized. Commercially, the game had the highest first-month earnings for a contemporary Crash Bandicoot title, topped sales charts in some territories, and was nominated for four awards.

Gameplay 

Crash Bandicoot 4: It's About Time is a platform game in which the player primarily controls either the titular character Crash or his sister Coco, who are tasked with saving the multiverse from domination by Doctors Neo Cortex and Nefarious Tropy. The game's levels take place and progress along a linear map that is divided into ten "Dimensions", each with their own theme. While Dornbush preferred the hub room format of selecting levels from the second and third games, he was charmed by the presentation of the linear overworld maps, comparing them to pop-up storybooks. Epstein commended the increased frame rate and faster loading times of the PlayStation 5 version, observing that the smoother and more clearly articulated animations resulted in faster gameplay and improved reaction times. Green and Chris Scullion of Nintendo Life, while acknowledging the lowered resolution and frame rate on the Switch version, considered the visuals to be impressive regardless.

The soundtrack was positively received for its upbeat and catchy nature and emulation of Josh Mancell's work on the original trilogy. Leri and Dornbush additionally enjoyed the special effects that the Quantum Masks' abilities had on the background music. Michael Damiani of Easy Allies, however, felt that the soundtrack was mediocre and had no stand-out pieces. Critics enjoyed the light-hearted, humorous, and self-aware script, and also commended the voice-acting, with Goslin singling out Horvitz's and Eagles's performances. Dunsmore, while entertained by the plot, characters, writing, and voice-acting, felt that the limited use of cutscenes left an inadequate amount of time to enjoy the performances, and wished for a longer story.

Sales 
In the United States, the game finished as the 11th best-selling game of September; despite being released in October, October 2–4 is considered by the NPD Group to be a part of the last week of September. It rose to tenth place in the October 2020 NPD charts. The game sold 402,000 units digitally in its first month, a lower figure than those of the recent remastered titles; by comparison, the Crash Bandicoot N. Sane Trilogy sold 520,000 digital units within the last day of June 2017, and Crash Team Racing Nitro-Fueled sold 552,000 throughout June 2019. SuperData Research speculated there was lessened demand for the new title, and observed that its particular release period was more crowded than that of its predecessors. However, they noted that the game's first-month earnings were the highest for a contemporary Crash Bandicoot title due to its higher price tag. Following the release of the PS5, Xbox Series X and Series S, and Switch versions of the game, the game rose to No. 15 on the NPD monthly sales charts from No. 65 the previous month. On March 30, 2021, NPD Group analyst Mat Piscatella observed that console sales for Crash Bandicoot 4: It's About Time were being sustained by the success of the mobile runner game Crash Bandicoot: On the Run!, as well as the game's launch on the Switch and continued digital promotion.

The game made #1 in the UK physical sales charts, selling 1,000 copies more than Star Wars: Squadrons, but physical sales were 80% less than Crash Bandicoot N. Sane Trilogy. The game made No. 2 in the UK digital charts. In Japan, the PlayStation 4 version sold 10,437 physical copies within its first week of release, making it the fifth best-selling retail game of the week in the country. The Switch version was released in Japan the following year and sold 2,288 copies during its first week, and was the 20th best-selling retail game in the country during that week. The game topped sales charts for the week of September 28 – October 4, 2020 in Australia, New Zealand, Italy, and France, with just three days' worth of sales. In Switzerland, it was the second best-selling game during its first week of release.

Awards and nominations 
The game was nominated for Best Family Game in The Game Awards 2020, but lost to Animal Crossing: New Horizons. It was also nominated for Outstanding Control Precision, Outstanding Family Game (Franchise), and Outstanding Sound Effects in the 20th NAVGTR Awards, but lost to Spider-Man: Miles Morales, Animal Crossing: New Horizons, and The Last of Us Part II respectively. GameSpot named the game one of the best of 2020 by score, and GameRevolution voted it the tenth best game of 2020.

Notes

References

Citations

Bibliography

External links 

 
 
 

2020 video games
3D platform games
Activision games
Crash Bandicoot games
Cooperative video games
Dinosaurs in video games
Multiplayer and single-player video games
Nintendo Switch games
Platform games
PlayStation 4 games
PlayStation 5 games
Post-apocalyptic video games
Toys for Bob games
Unreal Engine games
Video games about time travel
Video game sequels
Video games about parallel universes
Video games developed in the United States
Video games featuring female protagonists
Video games scored by Walter Mair
Video games set in the Arctic
Video games set in Australia
Video games set in the Caribbean
Video games set in feudal Japan
Video games set in Louisiana
Video games set in 1954
Video games set in 1996
Video games set in the 2080s
Fiction set in 2084
Video games set in the future
Video games set in prehistory
Video games set in the 15th century
Video games set in the 18th century
Video games set in the 31st century
Video games set on fictional islands
Video games set on fictional planets
Windows games
Xbox One games
Xbox Series X and Series S games